Lake Alice is an area located in the southwestern part of Rangitikei District of the Manawatū-Whanganui region of New Zealand's North Island. According to the 2013 census, it had a population of 2,724 inhabitants.

In the 2018 census, the Lake Alice area unit was replaced by the Parewanui, Turakina, and Marton Rural area units.

History

Lake Alice used to be serviced by Lake Alice Hospital, a self-sufficient rural psychiatric facility. Former patients of the hospital's child and adolescent unit made allegations of abuse during the 1970s, including the use of electroconvulsive therapy and paraldehyde injections as punishment.
The New Zealand government issued a written apology in 2001, and paid out a total of NZ$10.7 million in compensation to 183 former patients.  
The former head of the unit gave up the practice of medicine in 2006 in order to forestall a disciplinary hearing by the Medical Practitioners Board of Victoria. The facility ran between August 1950 and October 1999.

Geography
The Lake Alice area unit is defined by Statistics New Zealand to encompass a mostly rural area sparsed with a few small townships; these are: Crofton, Santoft, Turakina and Whangaehu. The area unit surrounds, but does not include, Marton, Ratana Community and Koitiata.

Lake Alice has the following boundaries: Pohonui-Porewa area unit to the north and northeast, Tokorangi-Hiwinui area unit (Manawatu) to the east, Oroua Downs-Waitohi area unit (Manawatu) to the southeast and south, Bulls to the southeast, the Tasman Sea to the southwest and west and Fordell-Kakatahi area unit (Whanganui) to the northwest.

Lake Alice's namesake is Lake Alice, an 11 hectare lake, located just southeast of the centre of the Lake Alice area unit.

Government and politics

Local government

As part of the Rangitikei District, the current Mayor of Rangitikei since 2013 is Andy Watson.

Lake Alice forms part of the Turakina ward and the Marton ward of the Rangitikei District Council, which elect one and four, respectively, of the eleven district councillors. The one representative of the Turakina ward is Soraya Peke-Mason. The four councillors of the Marton ward are Cath Ash, Nigel Belsham, Mike Jones and Lynne Sheridan. The mayor and councillors are all due for re-election in October 2016.

National government
Lake Alice, like the rest of the Rangitikei District, is located in the general electorate of Rangitīkei and in the Māori electorate of Te Tai Hauāuru. Rangitīkei is a safe National Party seat since the 1938 election with the exception of 1978–1984 when it was held by Bruce Beetham of the Social Credit Party. Since 2011 it is held by Ian McKelvie.

Te Tai Hauāuru is a more unstable seat, having been held by three different parties since 1996, namely New Zealand First, the Māori Party and the Labour Party. Since 2014 it is held by Adrian Rurawhe of the Labour Party.

Education

There are two primary schools located in the Lake Alice meshblock: Turakina School in Turakina and Whangaehu School in Whangaehu. The nearest secondary schools are Nga Tawa Diocesan School and Rangitikei College in Marton.

Demographics

Lake Alice had a population of 2,724 according to the 2013 New Zealand census. This is an increase of 30, or 1.1 percent, since the 2006 census. There were 1,068 occupied dwellings, 126 unoccupied dwellings, and 9 dwellings under construction.

Of the residential population, 1,392 (51.1%) were male compared to 48.7% nationally, and 1,335 (48.9%) were female, compared to 51.3% nationally. The district had a median age of 43.0 years, 5.0 years above the national median age of 38.0 years. People aged 65 and over made up 14.5% of the population, compared to 14.3% nationally, and people under 15 years made up 21.3%, compared to 20.4% nationally.

The meshblock's ethnicity is made up of (national figures in brackets): 91.3% European (74.0%), 13.7% Māori (14.9%), 0.7% Asian (11.8%), 0.9% Pacific Islanders (7.4%), 0.1% Middle Eastern, Latin American or African (1.2%), and 2.3% Other (1.7%).

Lake Alice had an unemployment rate of 3.9% of people 15 years and over, compared to 7.4% nationally. The median annual income of all people 15 years and over was $30,400, compared to $28,500 nationally. Of those, 35.3% earned under $20,000, compared to 38.2% nationally, while 26.6% earned over $50,000, compared to 26.7% nationally.

Transport

Roads
State Highway 1  goes through the eastern part of the meshblock, beginning just after Bulls and continuing further into Pohonui-Porewa meshblock. The North Island portion of this national state highway, one of only eight in New Zealand, begins at Cape Reinga and ends at Wellington International Airport.

State Highway 3  passes through the area from the northwest to the southeast. This highway connects Woodville (25 km east of Palmerston North) and Hamilton via New Plymouth.

Public transport
InterCity runs three daily and six non-daily services at the following stops: Lake Alice, Ratana Turn Off, Turakina. These include Palmerston North–Auckland, Wellington–New Plymouth and Auckland–Palmerston North.

The nearby township of Marton was serviced by the Overlander service on the North Island Main Trunk, a railway line connecting Auckland and Wellington, until 2012 when the Overlander was replaced by the Northern Explorer which has fewer stops. 

The nearest airports to the area are Whanganui Airport, located 15 km west of Whangaehu, and Palmerston North Airport, located 38 km southeast from Lake Alice Hospital. Both airports are domestic only.

References

See also
Lake Alice Hospital

Populated places in Manawatū-Whanganui
Rangitikei District